Dover and District Greyhound Stadium was a greyhound racing stadium located on what was Willow Walk Meadow, Buckland, Dover (modern day Alfred Road).

Origins
The stadium was squeezed between Buckland Avenue and London Road. The choice of location resulted in the track not being a standard oval and had unusual bends but as a consequence of the mass construction of greyhounds tracks during the 1930s it was not unique in shape. The proprietor was A. Kaplan of Ramsgate and initially greyhound and whippet racing would be held.

Greyhound racing
The opening two meetings were held on the Boxing Day 1932 (morning 11.15am and evening 7.45pm) and the racing was independent (not affiliated to the sports governing body the National Greyhound Racing Club). The venue struggled to attract good attendances and underwent several changes of management.

Closure
In 1935 the latest proprietor Reginald Smith was declared bankrupt and the stadium and Willow Walk Meadow became new housing.

References

Defunct greyhound racing venues in the United Kingdom